XHZL-FM is a radio station on 103.3 FM in Xalapa, Veracruz, Mexico. It is owned by CapitalMedia and carries its Lokura FM adult hits format.

History
XEJW-AM 1480 received its concession on January 22, 1943. XEJW was owned by Mariano Caraza D., sold to Ena Guzmán de Bouchez in 1955, and to Radiodifusión Moderna in 1965. By then, it was XEZL-AM 1130, broadcasting with 10,000 watts.

XEZL was authorized to move to FM in February 2011. The station was further authorized to move its transmitter to Acajete, a common location for Xalapa stations, in October 2017. On January 1, 2019, it flipped from pop to grupera as Capital Máxima; it then flipped to Pirata on January 28, 2020. On June 8, 2020, XHZL was one of seven stations to debut the new Lokura FM adult hits brand.

References

External links
Capital Media Website
Capital Maxima Xalapa Facebook

Radio stations in Veracruz
Radio stations established in 1943